Kiteworks, formerly known as Accellion, Inc., is an American technology company that secures sensitive content communications over channels such as email, file share, file transfer, managed file transfer, web forms, and application programming interfaces. The company was founded in 1999 in Singapore and is now based in Palo Alto, California.

In 2022, the company stated that its products were used by over 3,800 organizations worldwide. Beginning in late 2020, a zero-day exploit on a legacy product led to data breaches of dozens of government and private organizations, in multiple countries. The code vulnerabilities were confirmed in the company's legacy File Transfer Appliance (FTA) product and not present in the Kiteworks platform that is built on a separate codebase.

History
The company was founded as Accellion in Singapore in 1999 and was originally focused on distributed file storage. The company moved to Palo Alto, California and shifted its focus on secure file transmission. Accellion reached a total funding of about $35 million in 2011, and it was valued at $500 million in 2014. The company's chief executive officer, Yorgen Edholm, credited aversion to "National Security Agency–style snooping" as a factor in their success.

In January 2012, Accellion raised $12.2 million in funding from Riverwood Capital to continue their expansion.

In 2016, Accellion started to focus on security and compliance and released features which included data security, governance, and compliance. They also began integrations with major cybersecurity independent software vendors (ISVs).

In April 2020, the company received $120 million investment from Bregal Sagemount.

In October 2020, Accellion was rebranded as Kiteworks.

In January 2022, Kiteworks acquired totemo, an email encryption gateway provider based in Zurich, Switzerland.

Kiteworks is being used by 35 million users, across over 3,800 organizations.

Software

Accellion was working on file transfer systems by late 2002. The company released a file transfer appliance in 2005, a physical machine aiming to reduce server load when sending large files.

In March 2011, the company released an online file collaboration product, emphasizing security.

In 2012, the company launched a service allowing file sharing between mobile devices. It included a synchronization feature called kitedrive. Early demand for the company's file transfer applications came from organizations that needed to transfer large files, including healthcare companies and universities.

In January 2014, Accellion launched Kiteworks, a file sharing product allowing users to edit files and projects remotely, with interoperability with services like Google Drive and Dropbox. That December, the company released a set of programming interfaces extending secure file access to mobile devices.

In 2015, PCMag reviewer, Fahmida Y. Rashid, praised Kiteworks for its interface, support for mobile devices, and privacy tools.

In June 2017, Accellion received FedRAMP authorization for Moderate Controlled Unclassified Information (CUI).

In November 2018, Accellion launched the CISO Dashboard.

2020–21 security breaches 

In mid-December 2020, the company's File Transfer Appliance product—now a 20-year-old legacy system—was subject to a zero-day exploit, which was patched on December 23. Three additional vulnerabilities were discovered and patched over the next month. The first vulnerability was a SQL injection, allowing an attacker to use a web shell to run arbitrary commands and extract data. The four vulnerabilities were assigned Common Vulnerabilities and Exposures (CVE) codes 2021-27101 through 2021-27104 on February 16, 2021.

Out of approximately 300 total FTA clients, up to 25 appeared to have suffered significant data theft including Kroger, Shell Oil Company, the University of California system, the Australian Securities and Investments Commission, the Reserve Bank of New Zealand, and Singtel. Data stolen includes Social Security numbers and other identification numbers, images of passports, financial information, driver's licence data, and emails. According to computer security firm FireEye, the attackers comprised two hacking groups: one with ties to "Clop", a ransomware group, and one connected to financial crime group "FIN11". Many victims received extortion emails containing a .onion link to a website containing data dumps of multiple organizations. Prior to the attacks, Accellion had maintained that the FTA was a legacy product nearing the end of its life, with support ending on April 30, 2021, asking customers to move to their kiteworks system. David Kennedy, CEO of corporate incident response firm TrustedSec, said that "[t]he Accellion zero days were particularly damaging because actors were mass-exploiting this vulnerability quickly, and the severity of this wasn't being communicated from Accellion". Mathew J. Schwartz summarized the exploits this way "Among the many lessons to be learned from the mess is this: Attackers will devote substantial resources to reverse-engineer hardware, software or a service if they see a financial upside."

In January 2022, Accellion proposed that it would pay a $8.1m settlement in relation to these breaches. The proposed settlement will settle all legal actions Accellion only. They do no take into account legal actions against clients impacted by the data breach.

References

External links
Official website

Cloud applications
Data synchronization
File sharing services
One-click hosting
File hosting
File sharing
American companies established in 1999